Robert Walsh may refer to:

 Robert Walsh (Australian politician) (1824–1899), member of the Victorian Legislative Assembly and Attorney-General
 Robert Walsh (diplomat) (1785–1859), American publicist and diplomat
 Robert Walsh (Irish writer) (1772–1852), Irish clergyman, historian, writer and physician
 Robert Walsh (MP) (fl. 1417–1435), English M.P. for Lincoln
 Robert Walsh (priest) (died 1917), Archdeacon of Dublin, 1909–1917
 Robert J. Walsh (1947–2018), American film and television composer
 Robert Nelson Walsh (1864–1938), Canadian politician, member for Huntingdon
 Bob Walsh (American football) (c. 1919 – ?), American football coach
 Bob Walsh (basketball) (born 1972), American college basketball coach
 Bob Walsh (sports executive) (1940-2017), American sports executive, marketing executive and humanitarian

See also
Robert Welsh (disambiguation)